Samuel Tyszelman (born Szmul Cecel Tyszelman; 21 January 1921 – 19 August 1941) was a Jewish Polish communist who was a member of the French Resistance during World War II (1939-1945). He and amother man were arrested and executed for taking part in an anti-German demonstration. That started a series of assassinations and reprisals in which over 500 people were killed.

Life

Szmul Cecel Tyszelman was born in Puławy, Poland, on 21 January 1921. His family was Jewish. In early August 1941, three of them (Tyzelman, Charles Wolmark and Elie Walach) stole  of dynamite from a quarry in the Seine-et-Oise.

On 13 August 1941 Tyszelman, known as "Titi", was among a group of 100 young people, male and female, who walked out of the Strasbourg – Saint-Denis metro station and followed the tricolour flag of the student Olivier Souef. They sang  and shouted "Down with Hitler! Vive La France!" French and German police intervened. Germans soldiers opened fire, and Tyzelman was hit in the leg.>Gautherot fled but was pursued by a German civilian and caught in a porter's lodge at 37 Boulevard Saint-Martin.

Tyszelman, chased by German soldiers aided by an emergency police van of the 19th arrondissement, was finally arrested in a cellar of 29 Boulevard Magenta, where he had taken refuge.

Tyszelman and Gautherot were tried by a German military tribunal and sentenced to death.
 Notices in black lettering on red paper were posted the same day to announce the sentence and the execution.

Aftermath
At a session from 15 to 17 August it was agreed that members of the JC should receive weapons training and should increase sabotage and attacks on occupation troops. There was some resistance but with news of the execution of Gautherot and Tyszelman it was agreed to take a more active role. Of the JC leaders, Pierre Georges became primarily involved in military operations in the Paris region, while Albert Ouzoulias was more concerned with recruitment and liaison between the regions. On 21 August Pierre Georges and three companions made a revenge killing of a German soldier named Alfons Moser when he was boarding a train at the Barbès metro station at eight in the morning. When Adolf Hitler heard of Moser's death he ordered that one hundred hostages be executed at once. The German military commander in France, Otto von Stülpnagel, did not want to upset the Vichy government. He told Vichy he just wanted ten hostages, who would be shot if any Germans were attacked. On 27 August 1941 three Communists were sentenced to death by guillotine and were executed the next day. Over the next few days five more communists who had taken part in Tyszelman's demonstration were shot and then three Gaullists. This was the start of a series of assassinations and reprisals that resulted in five hundred French hostages being executed in the next few months.

References

Notes

Bibliography 

 
 
 
 
 
 
 

1921 births
1941 deaths
French communists
Jews in the French resistance
Jewish socialists
Polish Jews who died in the Holocaust
Polish emigrants to France
People executed by Nazi Germany by firing squad
Communist members of the French Resistance
People from Puławy
People from Lublin Voivodeship (1919–1939)
French civilians killed in World War II